Paris Is Us is a 2019 French drama feature film directed by Elisabeth Vogler.

Plot
A year after Anna and Greg meet at a party, Greg decides to move to Barcelona to take up a job as an air traffic controller. He wants Anna to come with him but she initially refuses. Greg is unhappy with her lack of ambition, while she is satisfied with her job as a waitress in Paris. Anna finally decides to join Greg in Barcelona but she misses her plane and later learns that it has crashed. Having so nearly avoided death, Anna goes into a tailspin and loses track of reality and the present. As her relationship falls apart, Paris becomes a mirror of her distress.

Cast

 Noémie Schmidt as Anna
 Grégoire Isvarine as Greg
 Marie Mottet
 Lou Castel
 Alexandre Schreiber
 Margaux Bonin
 Julia Kouakou
 Mathias Minne
 Clément Olivieri
 Theo Tagand

Production 
The film was funded through Kickstarter, before it was picked up by Netflix.

Release 
The film was released by Netflix internationally on 22 February 2019.

Reception 

References

External links
  on Netflix
 

2019 films
French drama films
French-language Netflix original films
2010s French films